Elections for Suffolk County Council as part of the 2001 United Kingdom local elections were held on 7 June. 80 councillors were elected from various electoral divisions, which returned one county councillor each by first-past-the-post voting for a four-year term of office. The electoral divisions were the same as those used at the previous election in 1997. The whole council was up for election and the council stayed under no overall control.

As with other county elections in England, these local elections in Suffolk took place on the same day as the 2001 United Kingdom general election.

Summary

Government Formation
The incumbent Labour-Liberal Democrat coalition continued in government with Labour group leader Chris Mole (Ipswich Town) remaining as council leader until he won a parliamentary by-election in November 2001. He succeeded by Jane Hore (Lowestoft Central), however in May 2003 she was replaced by deputy Bryony Rudkin (Priory Heath).

Election result

Results by District

Babergh

District Summary

Division results

Forest Heath

District Summary

Division results

Ipswich

District Summary

Division results

Mid Suffolk

District Summary

Division results

Suffolk Coastal

District Summary

Division results

St. Edmundsbury

District Summary

Division results

Waveney

District Summary

Division results

References
2001 Suffolk election result
Ward results

2001
2001 English local elections
2000s in Suffolk
June 2001 events in the United Kingdom